Naughty Neighbors is a 1939 Warner Bros. Looney Tunes animated short, directed by Bob Clampett. The short was released on October 7, 1939. It features Porky Pig as the leader of the McCoy clan and Petunia Pig as the leader of the Martin clan. The script was written by Warren Foster, the main animator was Izzy Ellis, and the music director was Carl Stalling.

Background 

Images of family feuds had become part of Folklore of the United States since the late 19th century, deriving from the depictions of actual conflicts such as the Hatfield–McCoy feud in the sensationalist press. By the 1930s, depictions of hillbilly culture in mass media typically involved two families engaged in an armed conflict over mountains and hills. Michael Frierson points that the image of the hillbilly so popular in media during the Great Depression, could have different meanings for the American audience of the time. On one hand, they were images from what was for most Americans a half-forgotten past. An Atavistic throwback to the 19th century. But the economic hardship that was also part of the hillbilly image resonated with what much of the audience was either already experiencing or feared it would experience.

Warner Bros. Cartoons adopted pre-existing stereotypes concerning hillbillies for their cartoons. As a variation, the familiar image of the bearded and barefoot yokel was transformed into that of an anthropomorphic barnyard animal. Otherwise, the characterization of the stereotypical hillbillies remained the same and humor was derived from their feuds, their violence, their stupidity, their odd speech, their music, and their laziness. The overall image was clearly related with other contemporary stereotypes concerning Southerners, such as their supposed strange way of speaking, laziness, and that they were quick to anger and resort to violence.

In the hands of Tex Avery, Bob Clampett, and Friz Freleng, the cartoon hillbillies emerged as figures who foiled the power of local sheriffs, drove away those who attempted to preach peace to them, rejected urbanization, and lacked work ethic. But also figures who remained free to do as they pleases and to reject the influences of mainstream American culture. Frierson views them as anarchists, an alternative to the "patriotic" and conformist characters depicted in so many films from the same period.

Plot 

In this Romeo and Juliet meets the Hatfields and McCoys short, the film is set in the "quiet hills of old Kaintucky" (Kentucky), where according to the introduction "the hill folk live in peace and harmony". This description is immediately contradicted by a brief view of a chaotic battle. The short properly opens by featuring the front page of a newspaper, the "Ozark bazooka", which reports that the leaders of the two rival clans have signed a non-aggression pact. The geographic references to Kentucky and the Ozarks are mutually contradictory. Also parts of the newspaper shows the Brooklyn Dodgers defeating the New York Yankees 6–2, and the weather which is fair and warmer, mentioning "warmer bros" (the beginning scenes such as the brief view of the battle, the "Kaintucky" introduction, and the newspaper clips were removed on some syndicated airings, including WKBD-TV Channel 50 in Detroit, Michigan in the 1980s). The following scene introduces the two leads, who start singing an idealistic song about how "the fighting ends" and about their new friendship. Or as Porky puts it: "Now we're pally-wallies". The clan members seem to belong to multiple species, many of their members being including chickens, ducks, and geese. Curiously Porky and Petunia are apparently the only pigs of either family.

As the song continues, side-scenes reveal that the two leaders are being overly optimistic. Their fondness for each other is genuine, but this is far from true for the other clan members. A black duck from the McCoy clan calmly observes to a white duck from the Martin clan, that it is unbelievable that after all these years of shooting at each other, their clans would end up friends. They both scream their conclusion that "It'll never work". Elsewhere, two ducks from the rival clans are dancing a graceful minuet, but interrupt their dance to physically fight each other. Progressively, people pretending to be friends are seen attempting to kill each other.

Before long, covert aggression between the two clans gives way to renewed hostilities. The entire countryside area is mobilized for war. Porky reacts by utilizing his secret weapon, a "Feud Pacifier". The device resembles hand grenade but is decorated with heart symbols pierced by arrows. He throws this "Pacifier" into the battlefield, and somehow several of the combatants change to maypole dancers. Others are playing marbles or are embracing each other. The finale scenes resemble a pastoral romance.

Analysis 

The film recycles a visual gag from A Feud There Was (1938).  In the gag, a mother cat attempts to use a milk churn to feed her hungry litter of kittens. Only one kitten can drink at any time, while the others cry. When bullets open additional holes in the churn, there is a stream of milk for each of the kittens.

The plot might involve a feud, but several scenes invoke images of war: a gas mask, a grenade, and a bugle calling troops to battle. In a memorable scene, a group of ducks hatch from their eggs, use the eggshells as helmets, and respond to the call of the bugle. Michael Frierson suggests that all the war images serve as allusions to the European theatre of World War II, which had just begun. The non-aggression pact of the film was probably inspired by the then-recent Molotov–Ribbentrop Pact (August 1939) between Nazi Germany and the Soviet Union. The insincerity of the pact between the feuding hillbillies, might then be a satirical view of such pacts between ideological enemies. The refrain of Porky and Petunia's song: "Something good will come from that", "that" being their pact,  is used for sarcastic contrast with the feud continuing around them. In the subtext of the film, it can be seen as a commentary that despite previous attempts at peaceful resolution, a widening war in Europe was inevitable.

The two leading characters, who never take part in the feud, spend most of the film interacting in a cute and romantic way. Distant from the battlefield, they promenade in the hills and act as a singing duet. Frierson sees their roles as resembling other romantic duos of film from this era, both live-action (Nelson Eddy and Jeanette MacDonald, Fred Astaire and Ginger Rogers) and animated (Mickey Mouse and Minnie Mouse). Frierson finds their singing and overall behavior to give this film a rather "saccharine tone", which may be too cute from the perspective of a "modern" (1990s) audience to actually enjoy. The main source of humor in the film is the contrast between their pacifism and the way that the rest of their clans embrace the conflict as part of their way of life.

The ending is abrupt and the grenade acts as a deus ex machina, resolving the feud in a rather unconvincing manner. The short functions as an allegory for war and a call for pacifism.

References

External links

1939 films
1939 animated films
1939 short films
1930s American animated films
1930s animated short films
Looney Tunes shorts
Anti-war films
Films directed by Bob Clampett
Films about feuds
Porky Pig films
Films set in Kentucky
American black-and-white films
Films scored by Carl Stalling
Films set in the Ozarks
Films produced by Leon Schlesinger